Anuja Patil (born 28 June 1992) is a cricketer from Maharashtra who plays in Women's Twenty20 Internationals (WT20Is) for India.

Career
She made her International T20 cricket debut, India Women Vs England Women at Galle International Stadium, Galle on 29 September 2012. Patil also played from Maharashtra state.

In October 2018, she was named in India's squad for the 2018 ICC Women's World Twenty20 tournament in the West Indies. In November 2019, during the series against the West Indies, she played in her 50th WT20I match.

See also
 India national women's cricket team
 Board of Cricket Control in India

References

1992 births
Living people
India women One Day International cricketers
Indian women cricketers
India women Twenty20 International cricketers
People from Kolhapur
Maharashtra women cricketers
IPL Supernovas cricketers